In superconductors, the London penetration depth (usually denoted as  or ) characterizes the distance to which a magnetic field penetrates into a superconductor and becomes equal to  times that of the magnetic field at the surface of the superconductor. Typical values of λL range from 50 to 500 nm.

The London penetration depth results from considering the London equation and Ampère's circuital law. If one considers a superconducting half-space, i.e superconducting for x>0, and weak external magnetic field B0 applied along z direction in the empty space x<0, then inside the superconductor the magnetic field is given by

 can be seen as the distance across in which the magnetic field becomes  times weaker.

for charge carriers of mass , number density  and charge .

The penetration depth is determined by the superfluid density, which is an important quantity that determines Tc in high-temperature superconductors. If some superconductors have some node in their energy gap, the penetration depth at 0 K depends on magnetic field because superfluid density is changed by magnetic field and vice versa. So, accurate and precise measurements of the absolute value of penetration depth at 0 K are very important to understand the mechanism of high-temperature superconductivity.

There are various experimental techniques to determine the London penetration depth, and in particular its temperature dependence. London penetration depth can be measured by muon spin spectroscopy when the superconductor does not have an intrinsic magnetic constitution. The penetration depth is directly converted from the depolarization rate of muon spin in relation which
σ(T) is proportional to λ2(T). The shape of σ(T) is different with the kind of superconducting energy gap in temperature, so that this immediately indicates the shape of energy gap and gives some clues about the origin of superconductivity to us.

See also
Ginzburg–Landau theory
BCS theory
Superconducting coherence length

References

Superconductivity